Roberto Lagalla (born 16 April 1955), is an Italian politician and academic, who has been Mayor of Palermo since 2022.

Biography
Born in Bari, at the age of two he moved to Palermo, where he grew up and in 1979 graduated in Medicine and Surgery at the University of Palermo, specializing in diagnostic radiology and oncological radiotherapy. In 1983 he became professor at the University of Palermo in "Diagnostic imaging and radiotherapy". He will later be rector of the same university from 2008 to 2015.

In 2006, he was appointed councilor with regional powers for health in the new council led by Salvatore Cuffaro; after Cuffaro's resignation in 2008, he will be forced to abandon the role.

In 2017 he founded the political movement "Idea Sicilia", with which he ran for the regional elections in Sicily that year, in the motion of Nello Musumeci, being elected in the district of Palermo with 8,158 preferences as deputy to the Sicilian Regional Assembly. From 29 November 2017 to 31 March 2022, when he resigned in order to run as mayor of Palermo, he held the position of councilor with regional powers for education and professional training, and, in the meantime, he joined the Union of the Centre.

Mayor of Palermo
In view of the 2022 local elections, Lagalla officially announces his candidacy for mayor of Palermo, which was supported, following long discussions, by the entire centre-right coalition. He is subsequently elected in the first round with 47.63%.

Controversies
During the electoral campaign for the local elections in Palermo in 2022, some newspapers make public the fact that Lagalla's wife, Maria Paola Ferro, is the nephew of Antonio Ferro, prominent boss of the Agrigento mafia, considered the patriarch of a Canicattì clan linked to the Corleonesi.

Although Lagalla has distanced himself from his wife's family, the spread of this news has helped to fuel the controversy according to which he is linked to the mafia world, already fueled by the support given previously to his candidacy by Salvatore Cuffaro, definitively sentenced for personal aiding and abetting towards people belonging to Cosa Nostra, and Marcello Dell'Utri, sentenced to 7 years of imprisonment for external complicity in mafia association.

References

1955 births
Living people
Union of the Centre (2002) politicians
Politicians of Sicily
20th-century Italian politicians
21st-century Italian politicians
University of Palermo alumni
Academic staff of the University of Palermo
Mayors of Palermo